Khakassia is one of the participating countries and regions competing in the Turkvision Song Contest.

History

2013

Khakassia made their debut in the Turkvision Song Contest at the  festival, in Eskişehir, Turkey. They were represented by Vladimir Dorju with the song "Tus Çirinde", Khakassia failed to qualify for the final.

2014

On 20 July 2014 it was announced that Khakassia would make their second appearance at the Turkvision Song Contest 2014 to be held in Kazan, Tatarstan in November 2014. A call for submissions for a selection process was made on 13 August 2014. The national selection took place on 11 October 2014, Sayana Saburov was selected by a jury to represent them in Kazan. In the semi final Khakassia performed 24th, they failed to make it to the final finishing 22nd with 148 points.

2016

On 25 November 2016 it was announced that Khakassia would not participate in the 2016 contest. Despite this they did select their artist, Irenek Khan.

2020 

Khakassia's participation in the  contest was confirmed in November 2020.

Participation overview

See also 
 Russia in the Turkvision Song Contest

Notes

References 

Turkvision
Countries in the Turkvision Song Contest